Ant-Bee (stage-name for Billy James) is an American experimental musician and writer. In his musical work, he is a psychedelic era revivalist, working with members of The Mothers of Invention; the original members of the Alice Cooper group, and Captain Beefheart's Magic Band.

Founder of Glass Onyon PR, he has represented music artists including King Crimson, Jon Anderson, Michael Bruce, Greg Lake, Mitch Mitchell, John Wetton, and others. As a recording artist with the name ANT-BEE, he is a multi-instrumentalist who has recorded and performed with musicians including members of the original Alice Cooper group Michael Bruce, Dennis Dunaway, and Neal Smith; the original Mothers of Invention; Bruce Cameron, and others; and produced his four solo albums, including Lunar Musik and Electronic Church Muzik. As a writer, he has co-authored and authored biographies of musicians including Michael Bruce, Todd Rundgren, and others.

In the 1990s James performed and recorded with musicians  including Michael Bruce, whose autobiography James co-authored, "No More Mr Nice Guy: The Inside Story of the Alice Cooper Group", first published in 1996.

Producer

Billy James helped to gather together an array of guest artists on the album Midnight Daydream from Bruce Cameron.

Author

James' rock biographies, such as the book Lunar Notes - Zoot Horn Rollo's Captain Beefheart Experience  written with Bill Harkleroad (Zoot Horn Rollo) have been reprinted after being out of print for years by GONZO MultiMedia UK.

Other
Interviews with Billy are featured in the DVD documentaries From Straight To Bizarre - Zappa, Beefheart, Alice Cooper and LA's Lunatic Fringe and Frank Zappa and the Mothers of Invention - In The 1960s.

Discography

Pure Electric Honey (1990)
With My Favorite "Vegetables" & Other Bizarre Muzik (1994)
Lunar Muzik (1997)
Electronic Church Muzik (2011)

References

External links
 The Official Ant-Bee Website
 Interviews with Billy James on Outsight Radio Hours

1960 births
Living people
American rock musicians
Berklee College of Music alumni
American jazz musicians
American male non-fiction writers
American writers about music
20th-century American musicians
20th-century American male musicians
21st-century American musicians
21st-century American male musicians
Musicians from Charlotte, North Carolina
Writers from Charlotte, North Carolina
20th-century American non-fiction writers
20th-century American male writers